The Africa Yearbook is an annual publication devoted to politics, economy and society south of the Sahara. It is the successor to the German-language Afrika Jahrbuch published by the Institut für Afrika-Kunde in Hamburg, which issued its last yearbook in 2004 (on the year 2003).

Scope 
The yearbook covers major domestic political developments, the foreign policy and socio-economic trends in sub-Sahara Africa – all related to developments in one calendar year. The Africa Yearbook contains articles on all sub-Saharan states, each of the four sub-regions (West, Central, Eastern, Southern Africa) focusing on major cross-border developments and sub-regional organizations as well as one article on continental developments and one on European-African relations.

While the articles have thorough academic quality, the Yearbook is mainly oriented to the requirements of a large range of target groups: students, politicians, diplomats, administrators, journalists, teachers, practitioners in the field of development aid as well as business people.

The Africa Yearbook received the Conover-Porter Award 2012 (best africana bibliography or reference work).

See also 
Brill Publishers

External links 
 Webpage Africa Yearbook (Website Brill Publishers)

References 

African studies journals